Ahmad Pasha or Ahmed Pasha or Ahmet Pasha may refer to:

 Gedik Ahmed Pasha (died 1482), Ottoman grand vizier (1474–77)
 Dukakinzade Ahmed Pasha (died 1515), Ottoman grand vizier (1514–15) 
 Hersekzade Ahmed Pasha (1459–1517), Ottoman grand vizier (various times 1497–1516)
 Hain Ahmed Pasha (died 1524), Ottoman governor of Egypt (1523–24) who declared himself Sultan of Egypt
 Kara Ahmed Pasha (died 1555), Ottoman grand vizier (1553–55)
 Ahmed-paša Dugalić (fl. 1598–1605), Ottoman governor of Bosnia, Belgrade and Temeşvar
 Ahmad Pasha ibn Ridwan (died 1607), Ottoman governor of Damascus and Gaza
 Hadım Hafız Ahmed Pasha (died 1613), Ottoman governor of Egypt (1590–94)
 Hafız Ahmed Pasha (1564–1632), Ottoman grand vizier (1625–26, 1631–32)
 Bakırcı Ahmed Pasha (died 1635/1636), Ottoman governor of Egypt (1633–35)
 Köprülü Fazıl Ahmed Pasha (1635–1676), Ottoman grand vizier (1661–76)
 Claude Alexandre de Bonneval (1675–1747), French army officer who worked for Ottomans
 Ahmad Pasha of Baghdad (r. 1723–1747), Georgian Mamluk ruler of Iraq
 Seyyid Emir Ahmed Pasha (died 1753), Ottoman Janissary chief and governor of Sidon and Aleppo
 Ahmad Pasha al-Jazzar, (died 1804) Ottoman governor of Acre, Sidon and Damascus (1776–1804)
 Hurshid Ahmed Pasha (died 1822), Ottoman grand vizier (1812–15) and governor of Egypt (1804–05)
 Müftizade Ahmed Pasha (died 1824), Ottoman governor of various provinces, including Egypt (1803)
 Ahmad Rifaat Pasha (1825–1858), member of the Muhammad Ali Dynasty of Egypt and heir presumptive to Sa'id Pasha
 Ahmed Muhtar Pasha (1839–1919), Ottoman general
 Ahmad Zaki Pasha (1867–1934), Egyptian philologist and secretary of the Egyptian Cabinet
 Ahmed Izzet Pasha (1864–1937), Ottoman general
 Izzet Ahmed Pasha (1798–1876), Ottoman governor of various provinces
 Ahmad Ziwar Pasha (1864–1945), former Egyptian prime minister (1924–1926)
 Ahmad Mahir Pasha (1888–1945), Egyptian prime minister 1944–1945
 Ahmad Shuja Pasha (born 1952), Pakistani general and director of the ISI

See also
 Ahmad (name)
 Pasha (title)